Hohenfelde is a quarter of Hamburg, Germany in the Hamburg-Nord borough.

Geography
Hohenfelde borders the quarters Uhlenhorst, Eilbek, Borgfelde, and St. Georg.

Politics
These are the results of Hohenfelde in the Hamburg state election:

References 

Quarters of Hamburg
Harburg, Hamburg